Sebeda was a harbour on the coast of ancient Lycia.

Its site is located near Bayındır Liman, Asiatic Turkey.

References

Populated places in ancient Lycia
Former populated places in Turkey